Chennamma may refer to:

Kittur Chennamma (1778–1829), the queen of the princely state of Kittur in Karnataka who fought the British army
Keladi Chennamma (died 1696), the queen of kingdom of Keladi in Karnataka, who fought Mughal Army of Aurangzeb